Uroš Vilovski (born 25 February 1984) is a Serbian-Hungarian handball player for Hungarian club Tatabánya KC.

Club career
In his homeland, Vilovski played for Proleter Zrenjanin, before moving abroad to Hungary. He was signed by MKB Veszprém in 2006, spending the next two seasons on loan at Debreceni KSE (2006–07) and Balatonfüredi KSE (2007–08). Over the course of his career, Vilovski also played in France, Romania, Qatar and Germany.

International career
Vilovski represented Serbia and Montenegro at the 2005 World Under-21 Championship, as the team finished as runners-up.

At senior level, Vilovski represented Serbia at the 2010 European Championship and 2011 World Championship. He later switched allegiance to Hungary and participated at the 2018 European Championship.

Honours
MKB Veszprém
 Nemzeti Bajnokság I: 2008–09, 2009–10, 2010–11, 2011–12, 2013–14
 Magyar Kupa: 2008–09, 2009–10, 2010–11, 2011–12, 2013–14

References

External links

 MKSZ record
 

1984 births
Living people
People from Senta
Naturalized citizens of Hungary
Serbian male handball players
Hungarian male handball players
Competitors at the 2009 Mediterranean Games
Mediterranean Games medalists in handball
Mediterranean Games gold medalists for Serbia
RK Proleter Zrenjanin players
Veszprém KC players
Montpellier Handball players
Handball-Bundesliga players
Expatriate handball players
Serbian expatriate sportspeople in Hungary
Serbian expatriate sportspeople in France
Serbian expatriate sportspeople in Romania
Serbian expatriate sportspeople in Qatar
Serbian expatriate sportspeople in Germany